ECIU can refer to:
 European Consortium of Innovative Universities
 Energy and Climate Intelligence Unit, a non-profit organisation based in the United Kingdom which debates about Energy and Climate change issues.